Dattatreya Raghunath Kavthekar (Devanagari: दत्तात्रेय रघुनाथ कवठेकर) (1901 – 1979) was a Marathi novelist from Maharashtra, India.

Biography
He was born in 1901 in Wai, Bombay Presidency. He lost both of his parents at an early age. After his high school education, he joined the Indian Army then under the British Raj.  He was a World War I veteran.

For some time, Nagpur University had included study of Kavthekar's fictions in its Master of Arts curriculum.

Works
 Ūmaḍalelyā Bhāvanā (1937)
 Ujeḍāntīla Andhār (1937)
 Nādanīnāda (1939)
 Gulābācyā Pākaḷayā (1940)
 Cāndaṇyāntīla Sāvalyā (1940)
 Apurā Ḍāva (1941)
 Reśamācyā Gāṭhī (1942)
 Śālan (1943)
 Mandā (1943)
 Āpulakīcī Jhaḷ (1962) 
 Vāṭa Pāhatã Locana (1965)
 Ābhāḷācī Sā̃valī (1967)
 Ruperī Kaḍā (1968)
 Malā Sobat Havīya -Phakta Sobat! (1973)
 Svapna Vegī Sare (1974)
 Mandā Mhaṇajeca Andha Andhārī Baisale (1978) 
 Vikhuralele Prem

Movies based on Kavthekar's novels
 Shubhamangal (1954)
 Kunkwacha Karanda (1971)
Apura Dav
Reshmachya Gathi

References

Indian male novelists
Marathi-language writers
1901 births
1979 deaths
Date of birth missing
Place of death missing
20th-century Indian novelists
Novelists from Maharashtra
20th-century Indian male writers